Union Mios Biganos-Bègles Handball is a French handball club from Mios, Gironde playing in nearby Biganos. Established in 2013, it is best known for its women's team, which has played in the country's premier league since 1996.

In 2009 Mios won its first national trophy, the Coupe de France, whose final had previously reached in 1998 and 1999. Two years later it won the 2011 EHF Challenge Cup, its first EHF international title, beating Muratpaşa Bld. SK in the final. Most recently it reached the 2012 Coupe de la Ligue's final, but lost to HF Arvor 29. The club's best result in the national championship to date is a 4th position, attained in four occasions between 1997 and 2011.

Titles
 EHF Challenge Cup
 Winners: 2011, 2015
 Coupe de France
 Winners: 2009
 Finalists: 1998, 1999
 Coupe de la Ligue
 Finalists: 2012, 2015

References

French handball clubs
Handball clubs established in 2013
Sport in Gironde